The 1923 Dartmouth Indians football team was an American football team that represented Dartmouth College as an independent during the 1923 college football season. In their first season under head coach Jesse Hawley, the Indians compiled an 8–1 record, shut out five of nine opponents, and outscored all opponents by a total of 202 to 54.

In November 1923, Dartmouth began a 22-game unbeaten streak that continued until October 1926.

Cyril J. Aschenbach was the team captain. H. Lester Haws was the team's leading scorer with 60 points scored on 10 touchdowns. Ed B. Dooley and R. B. Hall followed with 24 points each.

Schedule

References

Dartmouth
Dartmouth Big Green football seasons
Dartmouth Indians football